The 2020 Moldovan Federation Cup or the 2020 Cupa Federației is the first edition of the annual tournament in Republic of Moldova.  This tournament is divided into 2 groups of 5 teams.

Group A

Group B

Final Round

Final

Third-place match

Fifth-place match

Seventh-place match

Goalscorers
7 goals

  Vadim Gulceac

4 goals

  Sergiu Plătică
  Roman Volkov

3 goals

  Alexandru Mateescu
  Vasile Smîntînă

2 goals

  Vladimir Ambros
  Marius Iosipoi
  Nichita Murovanii
  Ion Postica
  Dan Puşcaş
  Eugeniu Rebenja
  Vasile Stefu
  Ihor Krashnevskyi
  Andriii Panych

1 goal

  Aleksander Dhamo
  Donalio Melachio Douanla
  Boubacar Traoré
  Dumitru Bivol
  Mihail Bolun
  Andrei Bursuc
  Marin Căruntu
  Alexandru Cebaniuc
  Alexei Ciopa
  Nichita Covali
  Vadim Crîcimari
  Ilie Damașcan
  Vadim Dijinari
  Ion Drăgan
  Valeriu Gaiu
  Eugen Gliga
  Adrian Hatman
  Sergiu Istrati
  Ivan Lacusta
  Petru Neagu
  Nicolae Nemerenco
  Alexandru Onică
  Artur Pătraș
  Radu Rogac
  Constantin Sandu
  Eugen Slivca
  Nicolai Solodovnicov
  Alexandru Starîș
  Vladimir Titievschii
  Serghei Trofan
  Iaser Țurcan
  Alexandru Vacarciuc
  Alexandru Vremea
  Yevgeni Ragulkin
  Oleksandr Masalov
  Renat Mochulyak
  Andriy Yakovlyev
  Oleksandr Yermachenko

References

External links
Home page  

Winter
Football competitions in Moldova